A Secret Vice is the title of a talk written by J. R. R. Tolkien in 1931, given to a literary society entitled 'A Hobby for the Home', in which he first publicly revealed his interest in invented languages. Some twenty years later, Tolkien revised the manuscript for a second presentation. It deals with constructed languages in general and the relation of a mythology to its language. He contrasts international auxiliary languages with artistic languages constructed for aesthetic pleasure. Tolkien further discusses phonaesthetics, citing Greek, Finnish and Welsh as examples of "languages which have a very characteristic and in their different ways beautiful word-form".

Content 

Tolkien's opinion of the relation of mythology and language is reflected in examples cited in Quenya and Noldorin, the predecessors of Quenya and Sindarin. The essay contains three Quenya poems, Oilima Markirya ("The Last Ark"), Nieninque, and Earendel as well as an eight-line passage in Noldorin.

A notable passage from the essay comes in a context in which Tolkien relates how he randomly met a fellow language inventor in the army:

Andrew Higgins writes that the "secret vice" was echoed in his text "Dangweth Pengolod" ("The Answer of Pengolod"), which showed Elves "practi[sing] and enjoy[ing] the same aesthetic pleasure in language invention that Tolkien did".

Publication history 

A Secret Vice was first published in The Monsters and the Critics and Other Essays (1983), together with six other essays by Tolkien, edited by his son Christopher.

A new, extended critical edition was published by HarperCollins in 2016, edited by Dimitra Fimi and Andrew Higgins. The new edition contains previously omitted passages from the original essay, Tolkien's drafts and notes, and a hitherto unpublished work on sound and language by Tolkien, "Essay on Phonetic Symbolism".

Reception

Of the edited book 

The book review in VII notes that in the essay Tolkien describes constructing a language as "an art, not merely a utilitarian endeavor", and that the product is "tied both to the creator's personal preferences and to a mythology". It comments that the essay sheds light on what Tolkien thought about "creating stories in fantastic worlds".

Of Tolkien's essay 

The Norwegian linguist and Tolkien scholar Helge Fauskanger writes that "In 1931, Tolkien wrote an essay about the somewhat peculiar hobby of devising private languages. He called it 'A Secret Vice'. But in Tolkien's case, the 'vice' can hardly be called secret anymore." Fauskanger comments that Tolkien spent his whole life "toying with enormous linguistic constructions, entire languages that have never existed outside his own notes? For one thing must be perfectly clear: He made very much more of these languages than he could ever hope to include in his stories." He notes, for example, that Tolkien created at least 12,000 words in his constructed languages. Fauskanger sees as significant Tolkien's statement in "A Secret Vice" that "The making of language and mythology are related functions", and that "Your language construction will breed a mythology."

See also 

 Languages constructed by J. R. R. Tolkien
 English and Welsh

References

Sources

External links 

 Tolkien's Not-So-Secret Vice

Essays by J. R. R. Tolkien
Constructed languages resources
1930 speeches